Clerk is a 2021 documentary film about the life and career of filmmaker Kevin Smith. It was directed by Smith's protégé and collaborator Malcolm Ingram.

Release
The documentary premiered in March 2021 at South by Southwest. 1091 Pictures acquired the rights to the film in August.

It was screened at the Count Basie Center for the Arts on November 4. It had a digital release on November 23, 2021.

Synopsis
The film documents the life and career of Kevin Smith, a filmmaker who broke into the industry with the low-budget comedy Clerks. It features interviews with various actors, directors, and other figures who have associated with Smith during his career, including Matt Damon, Richard Linklater, Jason Reitman, Jason Mewes, and the late Stan Lee.

Reception

References

External links

2021 films
American documentary films
2021 documentary films
American independent films
Documentary films about film directors and producers
2020s English-language films
Films directed by Malcolm Ingram
2020s American films